Wendell Phillips Stafford (May 1, 1861 – April 21, 1953) was an American attorney and jurist. He was most notable for his service as an Associate Justice of the Vermont Supreme Court and as an Associate Justice of the Supreme Court of the District of Columbia.

Early life and education

Born in Barre, Vermont, Stafford was the son of Franklin Stafford and Sarah (Noyes) Stafford. He attended the public schools of Barre and graduated from Barre Academy in 1878. Stafford graduated from St. Johnsbury Academy in 1880, and received a Bachelor of Laws from Boston University School of Law in 1883. He was admitted to the bar, and began to practice in St. Johnsbury, Vermont in partnership with Henry Clay Ide. Among the prospective attorneys who studied law in their office was William H. Taylor, who later served as an associate justice of the Vermont Supreme Court.

Career

Stafford was a member of the Vermont House of Representatives in 1892. He was a Reporter of Decisions for the Supreme Court of Vermont from 1896 to 1900. He was an associate justice of the Vermont Supreme Court from 1900 to 1904, succeeding Laforrest H. Thompson. He resigned to accept appointment as a federal judge, and was succeeded by George M. Powers.

Federal judicial service

Stafford received a recess appointment from President Theodore Roosevelt on June 1, 1904, to an Associate Justice seat on the Supreme Court of the District of Columbia (now the United States District Court for the District of Columbia) vacated by Associate Justice Jeter Connelly Pritchard. He was nominated to the same position by President Roosevelt on December 6, 1904. He was confirmed by the United States Senate on December 13, 1904, and received his commission the same day. His service terminated on May 4, 1931, due to his retirement. Stafford was active in Washington civic life, and one of the few white members of the local chapter of the NAACP. The Stafford, an apartment building in Washington, was named for Stafford by its builder, a friend and fellow Vermont native.

Other service
Stafford was a professor of law at Georgetown Law School and George Washington University. In 1901, Stafford received the honorary degree of Master of Arts from Dartmouth College. In 1907, he received an honorary LL.D. from Georgetown.

Career as author

Stafford was also a poet, and his published works include: North Flowers (1902); Dorian Days (1909); and The Land We Love (1916).

Death and burial

Stafford died at his home in Washington, D.C. on April 21, 1953. He was buried at Mount Pleasant Cemetery in St. Johnsbury.

Family

In 1886, Stafford married Florence S. Goss of St. Johnsbury. They were the parents of two sons. Edward was a Washington, DC attorney and the husband of Marie Peary, daughter of Josephine Diebitsch Peary and Robert Peary. Robert Burns Stafford was born in 1894 and died in 1901.

References

External links
 
 
 

1861 births
1953 deaths
Boston University School of Law alumni
Judges of the United States District Court for the District of Columbia
United States district court judges appointed by Theodore Roosevelt
20th-century American judges
People from Barre, Vermont
People from Caledonia County, Vermont
People from Adams Morgan
American male poets
Members of the Vermont House of Representatives
People from Mount Pleasant (Washington, D.C.)